Jean-Pascal Fournier, also known by the name JP Fournier (born 1972), is a French artist and illustrator known for designing cover art and logos for power metal and heavy metal albums. Fournier's illustrations typically feature elements of fantasy and mythology, such as heroic figures, monsters, and wizards.

Biography 
Jean-Pascal Fournier was born near Grenoble, France in 1972. Fournier began making art and illustrations at a young age, and graduated from the Emile Cohl Art Academy in 1995. Many of his illustrations incorporate influences from fantasy art, particularly depictions of monsters and magic. His style is inspired by Classical painting, Victorian art and illustrators of heroic fantasy. Fournier cited the influence of artists like Kris Verwimp, Derek Riggs, Joe Petagno, Ed Repka.

Over the course of his career, Fournier illustrated albums for bands such as DragonForce, Bewitched, Edguy (Mandrake), Elvenking, Avantasia, Impaled Nazarene, Mystic Circle, Seven Witches, and Steel Attack. Fournier illustrated Metal & Fantasy Vol. 1 by Frantz-Emmanuel Petiteau (2014).

On April 2, 2020, following an alleged suicide attempt, Fournier was arrested by authorities in Grenoble for the murder of his 80 year old father.

Further reading

References 

Album-cover and concert-poster artists
Fantasy artists
Artists from Grenoble
1972 births
Living people
Logo designers
Jean-Pascal Fournier